The 2019 FIA GTC season was the second season of the FIA-Certified Gran Turismo Championships (FIA GTC), a professional esports league for the racing video game Gran Turismo Sport, managed by Japanese developer Polyphony Digital and French governing body Fédération Internationale de l'Automobile. The series concurrently runs two championships in the duration of the season, in the form of the Nations Cup (entrants from their respective countries will represent them) and the Manufacturers Series (entrants will race for and represent their chosen manufacturer).

The series season opener began in 16 March in Paris, France, and would conclude at Monaco with the season world final for the second year in a row. Mikail Hizal would earn his first Nations Cup championship, and Rayan Derrouiche, Igor Fraga, and Tomoaki Yamanaka would earn their first Manufacturers Series championship with Toyota at the World Final event.

Series calendar 
Similar to the previous season, the 2019 season was set in six locations worldwide.

Series results

World Tour 2019 - Paris

World Tour 2019 - Nürburgring

World Tour 2019 - New York

World Tour 2019 - Red Bull Hangar-7

World Tour 2019 - Tokyo

World Finals 2019

References 

Gran Turismo (series) competitions
2019 in esports